HMS Kilbride was a sloop of the Kil class which were also referred to as gunboats, built for the Royal Navy during the First World War. It was designed for anti-submarine warfare, but was completed too late in the war to be used extensively in that role. The class were designed to be double-ended to confuse submarine observers, and were painted in dazzle camouflage.

Kilbride entered service towards the end of the war, and was sold for commercial use in 1920. She was subsequently sold to Italian owners and was sunk by British aircraft in January 1943.

Construction and design
The Kil class was intended as a patrol and escort ship to equip the Auxiliary Patrol with better sea-keeping and greater endurance and speed than the trawlers that were being used by and then being built for built for the Auxiliary Patrol. Large orders (eventually reaching 85 ships) were placed for the new design of "fast trawlers" from July 1917. The type was re-classified as a patrol gunboat in January 1918. Displacement was  normal. The ships had a symmetrical, double-ended hull, with identical bow and stern, in order to make it harder for enemy submarines to estimate the ship's course.

They were powered by a single triple-expansion steam engine, with steam supplied from a coal-fired cylindrical boiler. Design armament was a single 4-inch gun, with at least six depth charges also carried. The ships had a crew of 39 officers and other ranks.

Kilbride was launched at Hall Russell's Aberdeen shipyard on 21 August 1918.

Mutiny

On 13 January 1919, there was a mutiny on board while the ship was docked at Milford Haven. Eight men were court-martialled on charges of non-violent mutiny and sentenced to 90 days and two years hard labour followed by dismissal.

Sale and civil use
Kilbride was sold on 14 February 1920 to Robinson, Brown & Joplin for conversion to civilian use and resale and was renamed Scotsgap. She was subsequently renamed Rebus and then Poggioreale. By 1930, the ship was registered at Genoa as Nino di Gailura, and she was renamed as Alfredo in 1933, by which time she had been re-engined with an oil engine. Alfredo was torpedoed and sunk by RAF aircraft on 20 January 1943. She remained listed on Lloyd's Register at the start of 1943, but was listed by Lloyds as a War Loss during that year.

See also

1919 Southampton mutiny
Royal Navy mutiny of 1919

Bibliography

Notes

References

  

Royal Navy mutinies
20th-century history of the Royal Navy
1919 labor disputes and strikes
1919 in England
Battles and conflicts without fatalities
20th-century military history of the United Kingdom
1919 in military history
Military discipline and World War I
20th century in Wales
January 1919 events
Revolutions of 1917–1923
Kil-class sloops
Gunboats of the Royal Navy
Gunboats of the United Kingdom
1918 ships
Ships sunk by British aircraft